Jean Paul or variation may refer to:

Places
 Rue Jean-Paul-II, several streets, see List of places named after Pope John Paul II
 Place Jean Paul II, several squares, see List of places named after Pope John Paul II

People

Given name
 Jean-Paul, comte de Schramm (1789–1884), count and war minister of France
 Jean-Paul Behr (born 1947), French chemist
 Jean-Paul Belmondo, (1933–2021), French actor
 Jean-Paul Marat, French journalist and physician
 Jean-Paul Duminy
 Jean-Paul de Marigny, Australian football coach
 Jean-Paul Fouchécourt, French tenor
 Jean-Paul Gaster, American musician
 Jean-Paul Valley, first Azrael from DC Comics
 Jean-Paul Gaultier
 Jean-Paul Lakafia
 Jean-Paul 'Bluey' Maunick, British guitarist and producer
 Jean-Paul Samputu, Rwandan singer
 Jean-Paul Sartre (1905–1980), French existentialist philosopher, writer, and political activist
 Jean-Paul Savoie, social worker and former politician in New Brunswick, Canada
 Jean-Paul Vonderburg, former Swedish football player

Given name "Jean" and Surname "Paul"
 Jean Paul (cricketer) (born 1985), West Indian cricketer

Mononym
 Jean Paul (1763–1825), German Romantic writer
 Pope John Paul I (1912–1978)
 Pope John Paul II (1920–2005)

Surname
 Isaac Jean-Paul (born 1993), U.S. paralympic track athlete

See also 

 John Paul (given name)
 Juan Pablo, the Spanish language equivalent
 Joan Pau, the Catalan language equivalent
 Jean (male given name)
 Paul (name)

 Jean (disambiguation)
 Paul (disambiguation)
 John Paul (disambiguation)

French masculine given names
Compound given names